Saër Sène (born 4 November 1986) is a French professional footballer who plays as a forward.

Club career 
Born in Paris, Sène began his career in the youth system of Paris Saint-Germain, before being released in 2005. He dropped into lower division football, signing for FC Étampes, before moving on to Germany in 2007, joining SG Schorndorf for a brief spell. He then spent two seasons with SG Sonnenhof Großaspach, the last of which was successful, with the club winning a league and cup double. His league debut came on 31 August 2007 in a 1–0 victory at home against SSV Ulm 1846. He scored his first goal in the 89th minute in a 2–4 defeat at TSV Crailsheim. He concluded his first season with 21 appearances and four goals, in the following season, Sène notched 31 assists and 22 goals, including three hat-tricks.

In 2009, Sène joined Bayern Munich, as part of the reserve team squad. He represented the first-team in a few pre-season friendlies, scoring against Milan in the Audi Cup. He was a regular for Bayern II in the 3. Liga, and was named in the first-team's squad for the 2009–10 Champions League. He missed most of the 2010–11 season through injury, but returned for the following season, scoring eight goals in the first half of the season, only to leave Bayern on a free transfer in January 2012.

A month later, he signed for New England Revolution of MLS. On 17 March 2012, Sène made his MLS debut starting the match before coming off on in the 56th minutes for Diego Fagundez in a 3–0 loss against Sporting Kansas City in the club's second match of the season. The next game on 24 March 2012, Sène scored his first goal for the club in a 1–0 win over Portland Timbers On 19 May 2012, Sène scored his first brace in his MLS career in a 2–2 draw against Houston Dynamo. On 29 August 2012, Sène tore the anterior cruciate ligament in his left knee in a 3–3 draw against Chivas USA. Prior to his injury he had scored two goals. He was ruled out for the remainder of the season having scored 11 goals and gotten 3 assists, the most for a Revolution player since Taylor Twellman in 2007.

On 12 August 2014, Sène was traded with an international roster spot to New York Red Bulls in exchange for Andre Akpan and allocation money. Two weeks later he scored his first goal for New York in a 2–0 victory over C.D. FAS in the 2014–15 CONCACAF Champions League.

On 2 December 2014, New York announced that the club would not exercise its 2015 option for Sène. He joined Blackpool on 9 January 2015 in a short-term deal until the end of the season.

On 15 March 2017, Sène signed with Bulgarian club Montana until the end of the season. He left the club in June when his contract expired.

Personal life 
Sène is the son of Oumar Sène, a former Senegal international footballer.

Honours 
SG Sonnenhof Großaspach
 Oberliga Baden-Württemberg (V): 2009
 Württemberg Cup: 2009

References

External links 
 
 
 

1986 births
Living people
Footballers from Paris
French footballers
French expatriate footballers
French sportspeople of Senegalese descent
Association football forwards
3. Liga players
Major League Soccer players
English Football League players
First Professional Football League (Bulgaria) players
Botola players
SG Sonnenhof Großaspach players
FC Bayern Munich II players
New England Revolution players
New York Red Bulls players
Blackpool F.C. players
FC Montana players
Chabab Atlas Khénifra players
Expatriate footballers in Germany
French expatriate sportspeople in Germany
Expatriate soccer players in the United States
French expatriate sportspeople in the United States
Expatriate footballers in England
French expatriate sportspeople in England
Expatriate footballers in Bulgaria
French expatriate sportspeople in Bulgaria